Binnya Law (died 1538) was a senior minister at the court of King Takayutpi of Hanthawaddy. He and Binnya Kyan, another senior minister, organized and led the coastal kingdom's defenses, which successfully repulsed the upstart Toungoo's three dry season raids between 1534 and 1538. They both were childhood tutors of the young king, and were absolutely devoted to him. Nonetheless, both ministers were executed in 1538 by the young king who believed in Toungoo's misinformation that the ministers were Toungoo moles. After their death, the king found himself helpless. When Toungoo forces came once again in late 1538, he decided to flee rather than fight.

References

Bibliography
 
 

Hanthawaddy dynasty
1538 deaths
Executed Burmese people
Year of birth unknown